Sonshine and Broccoli are a Canadian children's music duo, from Toronto, Ontario, consisting of Lisa Sonshine and Brock Burford. They are most noted for their 2018 album It's Cool to Be Kind, which was a Juno Award nominee for Children's Album of the Year at the Juno Awards of 2019. The duo met when they both attended Sheridan College.

Discography
Sonshine and Broccoli Jam (2004)
Feel the Beat (2010)
It's a Beautiful Day (2015)
It's Cool to Be Kind (2018)
Hug Life (2019)
Born to Be Brave (2022)

References

External links

Canadian children's musical groups
Musical groups from Toronto